Airwolf, an action-espionage television series created by Donald P. Bellisario, premiered on January 22, 1984 on CBS in the United States and ended on August 8, 1987. The show spans four seasons and 80 episodes in total. The original pilot is two hours long (split into two episodes for syndication), while the episodes that followed are approximately 45 minutes long. An enhanced version of the first episode was released as a motion picture in several countries as well as on home video. The show aired for three seasons on CBS; it was later picked up by USA Network for a final season, made on a much smaller budget.

Three seasons of Airwolf were released on DVD in United States between 2005 and 2007, respectively. The fourth season was released in 2011. The original series was canceled due to declining ratings; the resurrected fourth season was not renewed due to poor viewing figures as well as being generally poorly received.

Airwolf follows Stringfellow Hawke, a pilot who has to retrieve the helicopter named Airwolf from the hands of its creator Dr. Moffet with the help from his friends, while going through a series of adventures. The original series starred Jan-Michael Vincent as Hawke, Ernest Borgnine as Dominic Santini, Alex Cord as Archangel and Jean Bruce Scott as Caitlin O’Shannessy. The cast of season four consisted of Barry Van Dyke as St. John Hawke, Michele Scarabelli as Jo Santini, Geraint Wyn Davies as Mike Rivers, and Anthony Sherwood as Jason Locke.

Series overview

Episodes

Season 1 (1984)
The series premiered after Super Bowl XVIII on January 22, 1984 with a two-hour pilot episode, and concluded on April 14, 1984, with 11 episodes aired. It began with Stringfellow Hawke hunting down Dr. Moffet and bringing Airwolf back into his protection, which Hawke would then use to go on flying missions of national importance for the F.I.R.M., the company that has the task of recovering Hawke's brother St. John Hawke.

Season 2 (1984–85)
The second season premiered on September 22, 1984, and ran for 22 episodes until April 13, 1985. In order to have the series move away from its quite dark and moody tales of international espionage into a more domestic and straight action-oriented affair, the show hired Jean Bruce Scott to play the role of a feisty Caitlin O'Shannessy. The moves by CBS ultimately proved unsuccessful, however, and while production cost over-runs remained high, creator Donald P. Bellisario left both the studio and the series after Season 2.

Sylvester Levay who composed and performed the music for season 1, composed 14 episodes of season 2. The remaining episodes were composed by Udi Harpaz (credited as UDI) (6), and Ian Freebairn-Smith (2).

Season 3 (1985–86)
The third season premiered on September 28, 1985, and concluded on March 29, 1986, with 22 episodes aired. Following the departure of series creator Donald P. Bellisario, Bernard Kowalski stepped in as executive producer for a third season, but after ratings remained low, the series was canceled by CBS.

Season 4 (1987)
For season four, CBS wanted to make the show into a more family-friendly, action-oriented program. Bernard L. Kowalski abandoned the project a year after series creator Bellisario had decided to leave as well. USA Network picked up distribution of the show, but with the remaining principal cast being too expensive to hire, an entirely new cast was created.

Season four aired from January to August 1987, and was produced on a comparatively shoe-string budget. Atlantis Production's contract did not provide the producers with the flying Bell 222 helicopter used for Airwolf, and recycled aerial footage and poorly produced special effects failed to match the quality of the prior seasons. The full-sized mock-up of Airwolf from prior seasons was used for static shots.

In the first episode of this new version, "Blackjack", Hawke's missing brother St. John was suddenly found, creating contradictions to the character's already-varied history. He took over as pilot of Airwolf with its new crew. "The F.I.R.M." was now suddenly referred to as "The Company", and gone were its famous white suits. Filming of the fourth season was completed in six months.

Notes and references

External links
  — television movie pilot (1984)
  — seasons 1–3 (1984–86)
  — seasons 4 (1987)

Lists of American action television series episodes
Lists of American espionage television series episodes
Lists of American science fiction television series episodes
Episodes